Erigeron peregrinus is a North American species of flowering plants in the family Asteraceae known by the common name wandering fleabane.

Erigeron peregrinus is native to northwestern North America from Alaska to Oregon. Some populations from farther south (California, Colorado, etc.) were formerly considered as belonging to this species, but they have now either been moved to other taxa or recognized as distinct species.

Erigeron peregrinus is a perennial herb up to 70 centimeters (28 inches) in height, spreading by means of underground rhizomes. It has hairless to hairy leaves reaching up to 10 centimeters long at the base of the branching stem, getting smaller higher up on the stem. The plant usually produces only one flower head per stem, each with 30–80 blue, purple, pink, or white ray florets surrounding numerous disc florets. Flowers bloom July to August. Its habitats include stream banks, bogs, and moist mountain meadows.

Varieties
Erigeron peregrinus var. peregrinus - Alaska, Yukon, British Columbia, Alberta
Erigeron peregrinus var. thompsonii (S.F.Blake ex J.W. Thompson) Cronquist - Washington

References

External links

peregrinus
Flora of the Northwestern United States
Flora of Western Canada
Flora of Alaska
Plants described in 1813
Taxa named by Edward Lee Greene
Taxa named by Frederick Traugott Pursh
Flora without expected TNC conservation status